Sybra inermis is a species of beetle in the family Cerambycidae. It was described by Pic in 1944.

References

inermis
Beetles described in 1944